The Communist Party of Spain (PCE) is a Marxist-Leninist party that, since 1986, has been part of the United Left coalition, which is part of Unidas Podemos. It currently has two of its politicians serving as government ministers in the Spanish government, in the roles of Minister of Labour and Social Economy and Minister of Consumer Affairs respectively. 

The PCE was founded by 1921, after a split in the Spanish Socialist Workers' Party (PSOE). The PCE was founded by those who opposed the social democratic wing of the PSOE, because the social democrat wing did not support the PSOE's integration in the Communist International founded by Vladimir Lenin two years prior. The PCE was a merger of the Spanish Communist Party and the Spanish Communist Workers' Party. The PCE was first legalized after the proclamation of the Second Spanish Republic in April 1931. The republic was the first democratic regime in the history of Spain. The PCE gained much support in the months before the Spanish coup of July 1936, which marked the beginning of the Spanish Civil War, and it was a major force during the war as well. The Republicans lost, and Franco established a military dictatorship, under which the PCE was one of the most heavily repressed parties, with specific laws banning communist parties, among others.

Under the dictatorship, the PCE was the main opposition to the Francoist dictatorship. In the early years of the dictatorship, many PCE members joined the Spanish Maquis, a group of guerrillas who fought against the regime. Years later, the Maquis' power declined, and the PCE abandoned the military strategy. Instead, it chose to interfere in the only legal syndicate (which was part of the Francoist apparatus), the Vertical Syndicate.

Franco died on 20 November 1975, and two days later, Juan Carlos I was crowned. Juan Carlos I would lead the Spanish transition to democracy, a time when the PCE became also extremely relevant, due to Franco's anti-communist legacy. Prime Minister Adolfo Suárez legalized the PCE on 9 April 1977, a decision which was particularly controversial, but ended peacefully. The PCE largely contributed to the restoration of democracy in Spain during the lead of Secretary-General Santiago Carrillo.

Since 1986, it is part of the United Left coalition. In its statutes, the PCE defines its goals as "democratically participate in a revolutionary transformation of society and its political structures, overcoming the capitalist system and constructing socialism in the Spanish State, as a contribution to the transition to socialism worldwide, with our goals set in the realization of the emancipating ideal of communism". It defines itself as revolutionary, internationalist, solidarity, republican, feminist, and secularist, specifically, of the laïcité variety.

The youth organization of PCE is the Communist Youth Union of Spain. PCE publishes Mundo Obrero (Workers World) monthly.

History

Establishment and pre-republican era

The PCE was the result of a merger between two organizations: the original Spanish Communist Party (Partido Comunista Español or PCE) and the Spanish Communist Workers' Party (Partido Comunista Obrero Español or PCOE). The former was created in April 1920 from portions of the Socialists' youth organization (Federación de Juventudes Socialistas or FJS) while the latter had been formed from a union of dissident Socialists (terceristas) and members of the General Union of Workers (Unión General de Trabajadores or UGT) who regarded the original PCE as not properly representative of the working class.

The two parties joined in the new Partido Comunista de España on 14 November 1921. The unified PCE became a member of the Third International and held its first congress in Sevilla in March 1922. In May, Jules Humbert-Droz, the top Comintern official in Western Europe, arrived in Spain to supervise the still fractious party and would continue to do so until the establishment of the republic.

By the end of 1922, the party had approximately 5,000 members. The PCE's left-wing engaged in political violence, especially in Bilbao, largely directed against other leftists. A party leader's bodyguard shot and killed a Socialist in November 1922 and organized party militants attempted a general strike in August 1923 that ended in a shootout at the barricaded party headquarters, resulting in twenty communists dead or injured and another seventy arrested.
 
With the advent of the dictatorship of Miguel Primo de Rivera in September 1923, political parties, including the PCE, were repressed and rendered largely powerless though not dissolved. The party continued to publish its weekly newspaper La Antorcha until 1927. In November 1925, PCE leaders joined with Comintern officials and leaders of the Catalan-separatist Estat Català in endorsing a revolutionary program calling for the following:
Abolition of Primo de Rivera's dictatorship and of the monarchy,
Creation of a república federativa popular (federal popular republic),
Recognition of independence for Catalonia, the Basque Country, and Morocco,
Total freedom of association,
Expropriation of large estates and distribution of land to peasants,
Organization of workers' councils in industry,
Formation of a central committee for revolution consisting of representatives from several parties as well as a military committee, and
A planned insurrection in Madrid.

However, Moscow urged a cautious approach, and the CNT and Basque nationalists were reluctant to cooperate with communists, so the plans were never carried out. The PCE continued to suffer from repression and dissension. The party's second secretary general, José Bullejos, purged the party of politically suspect members, and was himself arrested in 1928. In 1930, the arguments over doctrine led the Catalan-Balearic Communist Federation (FCCB) to break from the party and associate with the International Right Opposition. Amid this infighting, Comintern official Dmitry Manuilsky reportedly stated that, while Spain had "an excellent proletariat", it had only "a few little groups, but not a communist party".

Thus, the PCE was in a very debilitated state when the Second Spanish Republic was proclaimed in 1931. On 3 December 1933 the first PCE parliamentarian, Cayetano Bolívar Escribano, was elected. Bolívar was jailed at the time of elections and left imprisonment to occupy his post in the parliament.

Popular Front and Civil War

PCE was a small party during the initial years of the Republic, until it began to grow due to the victory of the Popular Front (of which the Communists had been a constituent part) in February 1936 and the beginning of the Spanish Civil War in July of that year. The PCE, directed by José Díaz and Dolores Ibárruri (known popularly as La Pasionaria), worked consistently for the victory of the Republican forces and the Popular Front government, but was wary of the social revolution that was being waged by Spanish workers.

The PCE leadership judged that while progressive laws could be passed, an attempt at a full-scale socialist revolution would needlessly divide the forces of the Republic. It would cause massive conflict behind republican lines, thus diverting military forces from the battle against Franco and driving many democratic republicans who were prepared to fight against the rebels into the arms of the rebels.

Being a well-knit and highly disciplined organization, the PCE could in spite of its numerical weakness play an important part in the war. In the first five months of the war, PCE grew from 30,000 members to 100,000. It also founded a Spanish branch of the International Red Aid, which assisted the Republican cause considerably.

In 1936, due to the special political situation in Catalonia, Partit Comunista de Catalunya (the Catalan branch of PCE) was separated from the party to fuse with other socialists to form Partit Socialista Unificat de Catalunya. Since then the PCE does not have an organization in Catalonia, but relies on a regional referent party. This set-up has been imitated by many of the communist splinter groups in Spain.

Resistance and reorientation
After the Republican defeat in April 1939, the PCE was persecuted by the Nationales of caudillo Francisco Franco (1939–1975), although maintained the best organization among the opposition parties inside Spain. During the initial years of the Francoist State, PCE organized guerrilla struggles in some parts of the country.

From the signing of Molotov–Ribbentrop Pact to the German assault on the Soviet Union on June 22, 1941, Spanish communists pursued neutralist policies with regards to Germany's aggression against Poland and France, regarding the war as imperialist and unjust. Much like the identical positions of other Moscow-directed Stalinist parties, this position was changed immediately after Germany invaded the Soviet Union.

A large part of the party membership was forced into exile. Some PCE members went to the Soviet Union and fought as volunteers for the Red Army during the Second World War, such as General Enrique Líster. A large section of PCE members were based in France, were a major party organization was set up. During the later half of the Franco years, PCE changed its strategy and started organizing Workers' Commissions (CC.OO.) within the official trade union apparatus. CC.OO. and PCE gained strength and became the backbone of the opposition forces in the country.

Dolores Ibárruri, "La Pasionaria", a dedicated follower of consequent Comintern policies, replaced Jose Diaz as General Secretary in 1944, and held the position until 1960. Santiago Carrillo was General Secretary from 1960 to 1982. In 1963, after the Communist Party of Spain abandoned the armed struggle, hard-line Communists, led by Julio Álvarez del Vayo, founded the Spanish National Liberation Front (FELN), a small splinter group.

Carrillo put the party on a eurocommunist course, distancing it from its Leninist origins. Carrillo accepted concessions to the "bourgeoisie", accepting the restoration of a liberal democracy and constitutional monarchy. This was regarded by many Party members as treason, for these concessions were made to classes the Party's doctrine called "exploiters".

Transition to democracy

The Party was legalized after the January 1977 Atocha massacre, on 9 April 1977, as one of the last steps in the Spanish transition to democracy. Only weeks after the legalization, PCE had over 200,000 card-holding members. But the concessions made by Carrillo (labelled "revisionist" by his orthodox communist opponents) and the social democratization of the party under his leadership provoked dissent amongst party ranks. Several party members left the party. Enrique Líster broke away in 1973 and formed the Partido Comunista Obrero Español. Other more radical left-wing groups that broke away were Partido Comunista de los Trabajadores (formed by the Left Opposition of PCE in 1977) and PCE (VIII-IX Congresos) (formed in 1971).

In the first elections after the transition in 1977, the PCE obtained 9% of the votes, and in 1979 it increased its vote share to 11%. By this time, however, the party had become increasingly divided into three currents. Carrillo's supporters were squeezed between, on the one hand, pro-soviet communists who had remained within the party and felt his Eurocommunist course took the party too far on a social democratic path and, on the other hand, "renovators" who advocated for democratizing the party and opening it up towards more collaboration with other groups on the left. In the midst of successive waves of expulsions of members who belonged to the minority currents, the PCE suffered an electoral defeat in 1982, getting just 4% of the vote.

Divisions in the party, collaboration with other groups in the United Left

After the 1982 elections, Carrillo was removed as general secretary, and the new party leader Gerardo Iglesias pursued a strategy of leftist convergence and collaboration with non-communist parties and social movements. Over the objections of Carrillo, who was expelled in 1985 and went on to found a new party and warn that supporting IU was tantamount to "burying communism", the PCE developed the "United Left" alliance Izquierda Unida (IU). This broad coalition initially encompassed parties ranging from the pro-Soviet PCPE to the socialist PASOC, the Progressive Federation, and the Carlist Party.

Despite its role in the anti-NATO protests of 1986, IU fared weakly in the 1986 elections, and by 1988, the Communist Party elected Julio Anguita as new General Secretary, which he remained until 1998. Under Anguita, the party took a turn towards the left and fundamental opposition to both PSOE and PP, and many of the members who had previously been expelled for pro-Soviet views returned to the party. By 1991, the party had 70,000 members, and IU rebounded in the 1989 elections, winning 9.1% of the vote that year and slightly increasing it to 9.6% in 1993 and 10.5% in 1996.

Notably, PSUC, the Catalan referent of PCE, did not reverse its eurocommunist course in the late 1980s, as the PCE had done, and gradually, PSUC and PCE grew apart. Finally, PSUC decided to dissolve itself into Iniciativa per Catalunya, and cease to function as a communist party. This provoked a 45% minority to break-away and form PSUC viu (Living PSUC). Since 1998, PSUC viu (United and Alternative Left) is the referent of PCE in Catalonia.

After Anguita's retirement, and succession by Francisco Frutos, the PCE again modified its course. Frutos led IU into the election of 2000, after signing an electoral pact with PSOE, only to see the IU vote halved to 4%. He was then himself defeated when running to become the new IU coordinator by Gaspar Llamazares, who pursued a course of further rapprochement with PSOE. Tensions within IU grew when Llamazares was re-elected as IU coordinator in 2004 with a plurality of the vote against the candidate who was supported by the PCE leadership, Enrique Santiago. He again defeated a PCE candidate in an IU leadership primary in 2007. The alliance suffered more disappointing election results (4-5% in 2004 and 2008). By 2009, PCE membership was down to 20,000.

After the 2008 election, Llamazares resigned as IU coordinator, and later that year, PCE politician Cayo Lara was elected to replace him on the platform "For an anti-capitalist, republican, federal, and alternative United Left". IU shifted back towards a more confrontational attitude towards the PSOE, and José Luis Centella succeeded Frutos as PCE general secretary the next year. For the 2015 elections, IU joined up with further partners in the Popular Unity (UP) alliance, led by PCE politician Alberto Garzón. It received 4% of the vote, and was eclipsed by the new left-wing party Podemos. UP subsequently joined with Podemos in the Unidos Podemos alliance, which received 21% of the vote in the 2016 election. The PCE, meanwhile, moved in its XX Congress in 2017 to explicitly embrace Marxism–Leninism again, marking a break with the previous forty years.

List of Secretaries-General

Federations of the PCE
The PCE consists of 15 federations:
Communist Party of Andalusia
Communist Party of Aragon
Communist Party of Asturias
Communist Party of the Balearic Islands
Communist Party of the Canaries
Communist Party of Cantabria
Communist Party of Castile-La Mancha
Communist Party of Castile-León
Communist Party of the Basque Country
Communist Party of Extremadura
Communist Party of Galicia
Communist Party of Madrid
Communist Party of the Region of Murcia
Communist Party of La Rioja
Communist Party of the Valencian Country

PSUC viu participates in PCE congresses, etc., as a PCE federation.

Electoral performance

Second Spanish Republic

Cortes Generales

See also
Valentín González
Juan Modesto
Jorge Semprún
Marcelino Camacho
Antifascist Worker and Peasant Militias (MAOC)

Footnotes

Further reading

 Tim Rees, "The Highpoint of Comintern Influence? The Communist Party and the Civil War in Spain," in Tim Rees and Andrew Thorpe (eds.), International Communism and the Communist International, 1919–43. Manchester: Manchester University Press, 1998.

External links
 

 
Far-left politics in Spain
Political parties in Spain
International Meeting of Communist and Workers Parties